VISAR may refer to:

Acronyms
 Velocity interferometer system for any reflector, a velocity measurement system
 Video Image Stabilization and Registration, a NASA spinoff technology
 VISAR, a fictional computer system in James P. Hogan's Giants series

Other uses
 Visar (name), an Albanian masculine given name